Anaxarcha graminea is a species of praying mantis found in India and Malaysia.

See also
List of mantis genera and species

References

G
Mantodea of Asia
Mantodea of Southeast Asia
Insects of India
Insects of Malaysia
Insects described in 1877